In probability theory, fractional Brownian motion (fBm), also called a fractal Brownian motion, is a generalization of Brownian motion.  Unlike classical Brownian motion, the increments of fBm need not be independent.  fBm is a continuous-time Gaussian process BH(t) on [0, T], that starts at zero, has expectation zero for all t in [0, T], and has the following covariance function:

where H is a real number in (0, 1), called the Hurst index or Hurst parameter associated with the fractional Brownian motion. The Hurst exponent describes the raggedness of the resultant motion, with a higher value leading to a smoother motion.

The value of H determines what kind of process the fBm is:
 if H = 1/2 then the process is in fact a Brownian motion or Wiener process;
 if H > 1/2 then the increments of the process are positively correlated;
 if H < 1/2 then the increments of the process are negatively correlated.

The increment process, X(t) = BH(t+1) − BH(t), is known as fractional Gaussian noise.

There is also a generalization of fractional Brownian motion: n-th order fractional Brownian motion, abbreviated as n-fBm. n-fBm is a Gaussian, self-similar, non-stationary process whose increments of order n are stationary. For n = 1, n-fBm is classical fBm.

Like the Brownian motion that it generalizes, fractional Brownian motion is named after 19th century biologist  Robert Brown; fractional Gaussian noise is named after mathematician Carl Friedrich Gauss.

Background and definition
Prior to the introduction of the fractional Brownian motion,  used the Riemann–Liouville fractional integral to define the process

where integration is with respect to the white noise measure dB(s).  This integral turns out to be ill-suited to applications of fractional Brownian motion because of its over-emphasis of the origin .

The idea instead is to use a different fractional integral of white noise to define the process: the Weyl integral

for t > 0 (and similarly for t < 0).

The main difference between fractional Brownian motion and regular Brownian motion is that while the increments in Brownian Motion are independent, increments for fractional Brownian motion are not. If H > 1/2, then there is positive autocorrelation: if there is an increasing pattern in the previous steps, then it is likely that the current step will be increasing as well. If H < 1/2, the autocorrelation is negative.

Properties

Self-similarity

The process is self-similar, since in terms of probability distributions:

 

This property is due to the fact that the covariance function is homogeneous of order 2H and can be considered as a fractal property. FBm can also be defined as the unique mean-zero Gaussian process, null
at the origin, with stationary and self-similar increments.

Stationary increments 

It has stationary increments:

Long-range dependence

For H > ½ the process exhibits long-range dependence,

Regularity

Sample-paths are almost nowhere differentiable. However, almost-all trajectories are locally Hölder continuous of any order strictly less than H: for each such trajectory, for every T > 0 and for every ε > 0 there exists a (random) constant c such that

for  0 < s,t < T.

Dimension
With probability 1, the graph of BH(t) has both Hausdorff dimension and box dimension of 2−H.

Integration

As for regular Brownian motion, one can define stochastic integrals with respect to fractional Brownian motion, usually called "fractional stochastic integrals". In general though, unlike integrals with respect to regular Brownian motion, fractional stochastic integrals are not semimartingales.

Frequency-domain interpretation

Sample paths

Practical computer realisations of an fBm can be generated, although they are only a finite approximation.  The sample paths chosen can be thought of as showing discrete sampled points on an fBm process.  Three realizations are shown below, each with 1000 points of an fBm with Hurst parameter 0.75.

Realizations of three different types of fBm are shown below, each showing 1000 points, the first with Hurst parameter 0.15, the second with Hurst parameter 0.55, and the third with Hurst parameter 0.95. The higher the Hurst parameter is, the smoother the curve will be.

Method 1 of simulation 

One can simulate sample-paths of an fBm using methods for generating stationary Gaussian processes with known covariance function. The simplest method
relies on the Cholesky decomposition method of the covariance matrix (explained below), which on a  grid of size 
has complexity of order .

Suppose we want to simulate the values of the fBM at times  using the  Cholesky decomposition method.

 Form the matrix  where .
Loosely speaking,  is the "standard deviation" matrix associated to the variance-covariance matrix .
 Construct a vector  of n numbers drawn independently according to a standard Gaussian distribution,
 If we define  then  yields a sample path of an fBm.

In order to compute , we can use for instance the Cholesky decomposition method. An alternative method uses the eigenvalues of :

 Since  is symmetric, positive-definite matrix, it follows that all eigenvalues  of  satisfy ,.
 Let  be the diagonal matrix of the eigenvalues, i.e.  where  is the Kronecker delta. We define  as the diagonal matrix with entries , i.e. .
Note that the result is real-valued because .

 Let  an eigenvector associated to the eigenvalue . Define  as the matrix whose -th column is the eigenvector .
Note that since the eigenvectors are linearly independent, the matrix  is invertible.

 It follows then that  because .

Method 2 of simulation 
It is also known that 

 

where B is a standard Brownian motion and

 

Where  is the Euler hypergeometric integral.

Say we want to simulate an fBm at points .

 Construct a vector of n numbers drawn according to a standard Gaussian distribution.
 For each , compute

The integral may be efficiently computed by Gaussian quadrature.

See also 
 Brownian surface
 Autoregressive fractionally integrated moving average
 Multifractal: The generalized framework of fractional Brownian motions.
 Pink noise
 Tweedie distributions

Notes

References
 .
 Craigmile P.F. (2003), "Simulating a class of stationary Gaussian processes using the Davies–Harte Algorithm, with application to long memory processes", Journal of Times Series Analysis, 24: 505–511.
 
.
 .
.
.
Perrin E. et al. (2001), "nth-order fractional Brownian motion and fractional Gaussian noises", IEEE Transactions on Signal Processing, 49: 1049-1059. 
Samorodnitsky G., Taqqu M.S. (1994), Stable Non-Gaussian Random Processes, Chapter 7: "Self-similar processes" (Chapman & Hall).

Further reading
.

Autocorrelation